Muricopsis seminolensis is a species of sea snail, a marine gastropod mollusk in the family Muricidae, the murex snails or rock snails.

Description

Distribution
This marine species occurs off Senegal.

References

External links
 MNHN, Paris: Muricopsis seminolensis (holotype)
  Vokes, E. & Houart, R., 1986. – A new species of Muricopsis (Risomurex) from west Africa. Tulane Studies in Geology and Paleontology 19(2): 88

Muricidae
Gastropods described in 1986